Music for Museum is a soundtrack album by French electronic music duo Air, recorded as a commission for the Palais des Beaux-Arts de Lille as part of their Open Museum project. It was released on 26 June 2014 as a limited vinyl-only release, only 1,000 copies of the album were printed. The album was printed on dual clear vinyl.

Track listing

References

External links
http://www.discogs.com/AIR-Music-For-Museum/release/5907625
http://www.vfeditions.com/product/view/164
http://modern-vinyl.com/2014/06/02/airs-music-for-museum-now-on-sale/
http://exclaim.ca/Music/article/airs_music_for_museum_soundscape_coming_to_vinyl

Air (French band) albums
2014 soundtrack albums